Xigou  (Chinese:細狗), also known as Xiquan  (Chinese:細犬), Xiliegou (Chinese:細獵狗) and Chinese Xiquan (Chinese:中國細犬), is a breed of sighthound native to China. Xigou is a rare dog breed.

Background
Xigou is an ancient native dog breed in China. Xigou is currently known to be 2,500 years old.
Xigou has always been popular with nobles and citizens of Chinese dynasties.There are traces of Xigou in many Chinese tombs and cultural relics. A hound that some cynologists speculate just might be the principal ancestor of all sighthounds known today. Once used to chase and capture prey on the open, flat land of the Huangtu Plateau, the breed is now in trouble, its numbers plummeting as a result of the government curbing the rights of its citizens to hunt. The China Kennel Union (CKU) classifies the breed as ‘rare,’ and is trying to resurrect it. To that end, the CKU initiated an effort to collect DNA from the dogs in 2017.

Appearance
Xigou has a long and narrow head, a flat forehead, small spacing between ears, drooping ears, a slender neck, a slender waist, a curved back, and a long tail. It is divided into short-haired and long-haired species, etc. Coat colors include caesious, black, white, and blood red, etc.

Variety
The existing Xigou species mainly include Shanxi Xigou (Chinese:陝西細狗), Hebei Xigou (Chinese:河北細狗), Shandong Xigou (Chinese:山東細狗) and Mongolian Xigou (Chinese:蒙古細狗),etc.

Shanxi Xigou
The Shanxi Xigou, also known as the Shaanxi Hound and Xi'an Hound, is an ancient and rare breed that originated in China. These majestic dogs are skilled hunters, dependable guard dogs, and devoted companions. Some experts believe the Shanxi Xigou is the original sighthound breed. The Shaanxi Xigou is characterized by a long, narrow sheep-like head, but not all descendants will necessarily inherit this head type.

Shandong Xigou
The Shandong Xigou is a rare breed with a keen sense of smell and innate hunting instinct.
Shandong Xigou once served as the royal hunting dog of the Tang Dynasty and has been a reliable hunting dog for centuries. In fact, in addition to working with hunters, this breed excels at protecting livestock on farms.

Mongolian Xigou
The Mongolian Xigou also known as Menggu Hound, Khitan Hound, Qidan Hound (Chinese:契丹獵犬). Mongolian Xigou is an ancient hunting breed known for its tenacity, keen sense of smell, and running ability.Mongolian Xigou was loved by some northern aristocrats in Chinese history who used Mongolian Xigou as a hunting dog and watchdog.Experts believe the Mongolian Xigou originated from one of the oldest dog breeds, the Saluki. Once a top hunting dog in Northeastern Mongolia, this breed is relatively rare today.

Hebei Xigou
Hebei Xigou is a rare breed in China. Hebei Xigou is similar in appearance to Greyhound. Hebei Xigou is mainly used for hunting hares.Hebei Xigou is very loyal to the owner, has a strong memory, a keen sense of smell, a high desire to hunt, and has good endurance. It is suitable for hunting in the plains and can also be used as a guard dog.

picture

References

External links
农广天地—山东细犬养殖技术(20120610)
中國細犬-維基百科
Xiquan-Norwegian Wikipedia
細犬-中文百科知識
中國細犬-百度百科
一個古老的中國犬種——細犬
中國細犬-華人百科
河北細犬-百度百科
山東細犬-百度百科
陝西細犬-百度百科

Dog breeds originating in China